Nuel Dinsmore Belnap Jr. (born 1930) is an American logician and philosopher who has made contributions to the philosophy of logic, temporal logic, and structural proof theory.  He taught at the University of Pittsburgh from 1963 until his retirement in 2011.

Biography
As an undergraduate, Belnap studied at the University of Illinois where he obtained his B.A. He recalled Max Fisch assigned Whitehead readings. After military service he attended Yale University and enjoyed metaphysics. His professors included Paul Weiss, Arthur Pap, Henry Margenau, Frederic Fitch, and Rulon Wells.

On a Fulbright Fellowship in 1958 he went to Louvain to study with Canon Robert Feys. Belnap domiciled in Brussels with wife and 2-year-old. Feys directed Belnap to read Wilhelm Ackermann's article on rigorous implication in the Journal of Symbolic Logic.

Alan Ross Anderson and Belnap began to discuss relevant implication. In 1960 Anderson told Belnap to write up the work he had done on relevance logic, and this was Belnap's PhD dissertation at Yale (entitled The Formalization of Entailment). The dissertation was published through Omar Kayam Moore at Office of Naval Research, Group Psychology Branch. Belnap became an assistant professor at Yale. He recalled hiring Jon Barwise and John Wallace as research assistants.

Pittsburgh University wanted Wilfrid Sellars, and according to Belnap, "Jerry Sneewind and I hung on his coattails." Adolf Grunbaum and Nicholas Rescher were at Pittsburgh. Vice chancellor Charlie Peake brought Alan Anderson to Pittsburgh in 1965, where he worked until his death in 1973. Anderson and Belnap were co-authors of Entailment: The logic of relevance and necessity. "The way we worked when we worked together was cheek by jaw. We just sat down and wrote sentences together."

Belnap became full professor in 1966. Kurt Baier was department chairman. Belnap began to teach philosophy of social sciences, with students including Bas van Fraassen and Jon Michael Dunn. In 1967 he became professor of sociology and in 1971 professor philosophy of science. Eventually he occupied the endowed chair named for Alan Ross Anderson. He recalled Rich Tomason, student of intelligent systems, passing through Pitt.

Wary of consequences of contradictory stored data, Belnap proposed a four-valued logic to avoid run-away inferences such as (A & ~A) → B for an arbitrary statement B. Known as the principle of explosion in classical logic, the four-valued logic provides a basis for paraconsistent logic to avoid this pathology of two-valued logic.

In 1976 Belnap and T. B. Steel Jr. published The Logic of Questions and Answers as a timely contribution to erotetics. Beyond propositional logic, they noted that the evolving databases make possible "dossier files on individuals" (page 146) leading to the "problem of privacy in record keeping." The book included a 45-page annotated bibliography of erotetics, sectioned by philosophy, linguistics, automatic question-answering, and pedagogy, compiled by Hubert Schleichert and Urs Egli.

On sabbatical, Belnap was visiting professor at the University of California, Irvine and at Indiana University Bloomington, in the falls of 1977, 1978, 1979 with Jon Michael Dunn. In 1982 at Stanford's Center for Advanced Studies in the Behavioral Sciences, and in 1996 at Leipzig, Centrum für Höhere Studien with Heirich Wansing. He was a founding member of the Society for Exact Philosophy, which collaborated with Canadians such as Mario Bunge. Belnap has served as referee for many academic papers.

He was elected a Fellow of the American Academy of Arts and Sciences in 2008.

Selected works
 1975: (with Dorothy L. Grover & Joseph L. Camp) "The Prosentential Theory of Truth", Philosophical Studies 27(1): 73–125
 1993: (with Anil Gupta) The Revision Theory of Truth, MIT Press
 2001: (with Ming Xu and Michel Perloff) Facing the Future: agents and choices in our indeterministic world, Oxford University Press.

See also
 Logical harmony

References

External links
 Works by Nuel Belnap at PhilPapers
 Nuel Belnap at University of Pittsburgh

1930 births
20th-century American philosophers
21st-century American philosophers
American logicians
Analytic philosophers
Fellows of the American Academy of Arts and Sciences
Living people
University of Pittsburgh faculty
Yale Graduate School of Arts and Sciences alumni